Moji Solar-Wilson (born in 1964) from Ijero-Ekiti in Ekiti State, is a Nigerian US-based real estate broker, LGBTQIA+ activist, social commentator, and the CEO of Solar Worldwide Realty Inc. In 2017, she married her Nigerian-American lesbian partner, Margaret Wilson, and became the first known legally married  Nigerian lesbian couple.

References 

1968 births
Living people
Nigerian lesbians
Nigerian LGBT rights activists